Fight Network was a British programming block that broadcast nightly over the channel space of Showcase by Information TV. The channel was owned by Anthem Sports & Entertainment and available through Showcase by Information TV at 9:00 PM every night. Programming featured combat sports from around the world. The channel launched on 17 July 2018 and was based on the Canadian channel of the same name. The channel itself was a revival of the previous version of The Fight Network, which formally broadcast under the name of TWC Fight! and The Wrestling Channel before ceasing transmissions in 2008. However, the channel ceased operations on Showcase in September 2020.

History

Relaunch
On 13 July 2018, it was announced that Anthem Sports & Entertainment Corp. would relaunch Fight Network as a programming block on Showcase by Information TV. The block would feature various sports, including live Impact Wrestling, Ultimate Challenge MMA, Abu Dhabi Grand Slam, WGP Kickboxing, Wrestling at the Chase and other programmes. Due to the way it was placed and the obscurity of the original version, Anthem were treating it as a new channel launch.
 
Later in 2019 the channel would add other wrestling promotions like Ring Of Honor, Smash Wrestling, Championship Wrestling from Hollywood and British promotion Preston City Wrestling with them airing on different days than Impact!.

Closure
On 26 August 2020, Anthem announced that the programming block would no longer be available on Showcase from September 2020, effectively ceasing its operations.

Programming 
The most notable content to air on Fight Network is a simulcast of Impact Wrestling, which aired in the United Kingdom on Wednesdays at 9.00pm .

International 
 Abu Dhabi Grand Slam
 Boxing World Weekly
 Championship Wrestling from Hollywood
 Impact Wrestling
 Impact! Xplosion
 International Wrestling Syndicate
 Retrospective
 Ring Of Honor 
 Smash Wrestling
 Ultimate Challenge MMA
 WGP Kickboxing
 Wrestling at the Chase
 World Arm Wrestling League

British 
 British Boot Camp
 Preston City Wrestling
 Wrestle Talk TV

References

Anthem Sports & Entertainment
Television channels and stations established in 2018
Television channels and stations disestablished in 2020
Sports television channels in the United Kingdom